Eddelsisingh Emma Naris (born 8 November 1996), known as Emma Naris, is a Namibian footballer who plays as a defender for the Namibia women's national team.

International career
Naris capped for Namibia at senior level during the 2018 Africa Women Cup of Nations qualification.

References

1996 births
Living people
Namibian women's footballers
Namibia women's international footballers
Women's association football defenders